Yussuff is both a given name and a surname. Notable people with the name include:

 Hassan Yussuff (born 1957), Canadian politician
 Rashid Yussuff (born 1989), English footballer
 Yussuff Izzuddin Shah of Perak (1890–1932), Sultan of Perak

See also
 Yussuf
 Yusuff
 Yusuf